Collie or Colly is a surname, given name, and nickname. It may refer to:

People with the surname 

 Alexander Collie (1793–1835), Scottish surgeon and naturalist
 Anthony Colly, English politician
 Austin Collie (born 1985), American retired National Football League player
 Bruce Collie (born 1962), American retired National Football League player
 J. Norman Collie (1859–1942), British explorer and scientist
 John Collie (musician), New Zealand retired drummer
 Mark Collie (born 1956), American country singer/songwriter and actor
 Max Collie (born 1931), Australian jazz trombonist
 Robert John Collie (born 1935), Scottish politician

People with the given name 

 Collie Knox (1899–1977), British author and journalist
 David Collie Martin (1890–1917), Scottish footballer
 Collie O'Shea (born 1991), Irish rugby union player

People with the nickname 

 Paul Collingwood (born 1976), English cricketer
 Colin Moran (Gaelic footballer) (born 1980), Gaelic footballer
 Collie Smith (1933–1959), Jamaican cricketer

See also 

 
 
 Colley (disambiguation)
 Colley (given name)
 Colley (surname)
 Collie (disambiguation)
 Colly Ezeh (born 1979), Hong Kong football player originally from Nigeria

Lists of people by nickname